The Outer Hebrides is a chain of more than 100 islands and small skerries located about  west of mainland Scotland. There are 15 inhabited islands in this archipelago, which is also known as the Western Isles and archaically as the Long Isle.

Lewis and Harris is the largest island in Scotland and the third largest in the British Isles, after Great Britain and Ireland. It incorporates Lewis in the north and Harris in the south, both of which are frequently referred to as individual islands, although they are joined by a land border. The largest settlement in Lewis and in the Outer Hebrides is Stornoway.

To the south across the Sound of Harris lie the Uists and Benbecula, which were joined by a series of causeways constructed between 1940 and 1960 to improve transport links. Further south are Barra and the smaller Barra Isles, whose southernmost extremity is Barra Head. There are other outliers with cultural links to the Outer Hebrides that are not part of the archipelago itself.

The islands of Scotland's west coast are known collectively as the Hebrides and the Outer Hebrides are separated from  the Inner Hebrides by The Minch to the north and the Sea of the Hebrides to the south. The Outer Hebrides are administered by Comhairle nan Eilean Siar and had a population of 26,502 in 2001. The Outer Hebrides have historically been a strong Scottish Gaelic (Gàidhlig) speaking area. Despite recent declines, in the 2001 census more than 50% of the resident population in each island was able to speak Gaelic, for an overall total of 15,842 speakers throughout the archipelago. The modern economy centres on tourism, crofting, fishing, and weaving, the latter of which includes the manufacture of Harris tweed. The archipelago is exposed to wind and tide, and there are numerous lighthouses as an aid to navigation.

The definition of an island used in this list is that it is "land that is surrounded by seawater on a daily basis, but not necessarily at all stages of the tide, excluding human devices such as bridges and causeways".

Inhabited islands

The inhabited islands of the Outer Hebrides had a total population of 26,502 in 2001 and 27,684 at the time of the 2011 census.

The highest peaks of the islands have names deriving from both Gaelic and Old Norse indicating the historical importance of these two cultures. The archeological record for the period of Viking domination during the Early Historic period is however very limited, the Lewis chessmen being an exception.

In addition to the North Ford (Oitir Mhòr) and South Ford causeways that connect North and South Uist,  Benbecula and the northern of the two Grimsays in the southern part of the island chain, several other islands are now connected by causeways and bridges. Great Bernera and Scalpay have bridge connections to Lewis and Harris respectively, Baleshare and Berneray are linked to North Uist, Eriskay to South Uist, Flodaigh, Fraoch-eilean and the southern Grimsay to Benbecula, and Vatersay is connected to Barra by a causeway. This means that all of the inhabited islands are now connected to at least one other island by a land transport route.

Ensay, Kisimul Castle and Eilean na Cille are "included in the NRS statistical geography for inhabited islands but had no usual residents at the time of either the 2001 or 2011 censuses".

Uninhabited islands

This is a list of islands with an area greater than 25 hectares (approximately 37 acres). Records for the last date of settlement for the smaller uninhabited islands are incomplete, but most of the islands listed here would have been inhabited at some point during the Neolithic, Iron Age, Early Historic or Norse periods.

In common with the other main island chains of Scotland many of the more remote islands were abandoned during the 19th and 20th centuries, in some cases after continuous habitation since the prehistoric period. This process  involved a transition from these places being perceived as relatively self-sufficient agricultural economies to a view becoming held by both island residents and outsiders alike that the more remote islands lacked the essential services of a modern industrial economy.

Some of the islands continue to contribute to modern culture. The "Mingulay Boat Song", although evocative of island life, was written after the abandonment of the island in 1938 and Taransay hosted the BBC television series ‘’Castaway 2000’’. Others have played a part in Scottish history. On 4 May 1746, Bonnie Prince Charlie hid on Eilean Liubhaird with some of his men for four days whilst Royal Navy vessels patrolled the Minch. They camped under a sail stretched over a "low pitiful hut" while it rained torrentially.

The difficulties of definition are considerable in some cases. For example, Haswell-Smith (2004) treats Eileanan Iasgaich as a single island of 50 ha, although during high tides it becomes several tidal islets—none of which is ever connected to the "mainland" of South Uist. Despite its name Eilean an Taighe (English: "house island") in the Shiant Islands does not qualify for inclusion as it is connected to Garbh Eilean by a natural isthmus.

The Eileanan Chearabhaigh are a complex group of islets off the east coast of Benbecula, the area of which changes as the tides rise and fall. The total area is circa 49 hectares and largest part that might be considered to be a genuine island is circa 32 hectares.

Smaller islets and skerries

Smaller islands, tidal islets only separated at higher stages of the tide, and skerries that are only exposed at lower stages of the tide pepper the North Atlantic surrounding the main islands. This is a continuing list of these smaller Outer Hebridean islands.

Many of them are obscure and few have ever been inhabited. Nonetheless, some have a significant degree of notability. The islet on which Kisimul Castle stands is the ancient seat of Clan MacNeil and Shillay in the Monach Isles had a staffed lighthouse until 1942. The tiny Beasts of Holm of the east coast of Lewis were the site of the sinking of the Iolaire during the first few hours of 1919, one of the worst maritime disasters in United Kingdom waters during the 20th century. Calvay in the Sound of Barra provided the inspiration for Compton MacKenzie's 1947 novel Whiskey Galore after the  ran aground there with a cargo of whisky. Unusually for an island without permanent inhabitation, Eilean na Cille is connected to Grimsay (south) by a causeway.

Various Gaelic names are used repeatedly. The suffix ay or aigh or aidh is generally from the Norse øy meaning "island". Eilean (plural: eileanan) also means "island". Beag and mòr (also bheag and mhòr) mean "little" and "big" and are often found together. Sgeir is "skerry" and often refers to a rock or rocks that lie submerged at high tide. Dubh is "black", dearg is "red" and glas means "grey" or "green". Orasaigh is from the Norse Örfirirsey meaning "tidal" or "ebb island".

Smaller islands grouped geographically:

Barra and the Barra Isles

Barra: Eilean a' Mhail, Eilean Mhiathlais, Eileanan Dubha, Greanamul, Healam, Kisimul Castle, Lamalum, Lingeigh-Fada, Orasaigh (2), Sgeir Mhòr, Sgeirislum
Barra Head: Rubha Niosaim and Sgeir Mhòr
Flodday: None
Lingeigh: None.
Mingulay: Arnamuil, Barnacle Rock, Geirum Beag, Geirum Mòr, Gunamul. Lianamul, Sgeirean nan Uibhein, Solon Beag, Solon Mòr, Sròn à Dùin and The Red Boy.
Muldoanich:  An Laogh, Sgeirean Fiaclach.
Pabbay: Greenamul, Heisgeir a-muigh, Heisgeir a-staigh, Lingeigh, Roisnis
Sandray: Cleite, Creag an Sheadair, Eilean Mòr, Sgeir Lithinis
Vatersay: Biruaslum, Orasaigh, Sgeir Liath, Sgeir na Muice, Snuasamul, Uineasan

Sound of Barra
Eriskay: Calbhaigh, Eilean à Gheoidh, Eileanan Dubha, Hearteamul, Lingay, Na Stacan Dubha, Sgeir an Fheidh
Fiaraidh: Corran Bàn
Flodday: Snagaras
Fuday: Traillisgeir
Fuiay: Eilean Sheumis, Garbh Lingeigh
Gighay: Eilean à Ceud
Hellisay: Bodha nan Sgeiran Mòra
Orosay: None

South Uist

West coast: Eilean Bheirean, Eilean Cuithe nam Fiadh, Gualan, Orasaigh
North east coast: Dioraigh, Eilean à Mhadaidh, Eilean Ban, Eilean Ornais, Eilean na h-Airde Mhoire, Gasaigh, Glas-Eileanan, Luirsaigh Dubh, Luirsaigh Glas, Orasaigh, Sioloagh Mòr, Tathanais
East coast: Cleit a' Ghlinn Mhòir, Dùn Othail, Eilean Bholuim, Eilean nan Ghamna, Na Dubh-sgeiran
Loch Aineort: Eilean Ailein, Eilean an Easbuig, Eilean Mhic Eachain, Rosgaigh, Unsaraigh Islands
Lochboisdale: 
Eileanan Iasgaich:  Main group: Eilean Bàgh Mhic Rois, Eileanan Iasgaich Beag, Eileanan Iasgaich Meadhonach, Eileanan Iasgaich Mòr, Eilean nam Feannag. Surrounding: Eilean Mòr, Eilean nan Moireachean, Gasaigh, Pabaigh, Sgeir Chaise. Further east: Calbhaigh, Calvay Castle.
Stuley: Dubh-Sgeir Mhòr,  Glas-Eilean Mòr

Benbecula

North coast: Calabhagh, Eilean Leathann, Eilean Mhic Caoilte, Sunamul, Traillabreac Mòr
East coast:  Bearran, Collam, Eilean Baile Gearriadh, Eilean Dubh na Muice, Eilean nan Each, Fuidheigh Beag, Greanamul, Greanamul Deas, Maithidh Glas, Maithidh Riabhach, Maragaidh Beag, Maragaidh Mòr, Orasaigh (2), Orasaigh Uisgeabhagh
South coast: Eilean Ard an Eoin, Heistamuil
Fraoch-eilean: Eilean Roinoch, Mas Grimsay
Flodaigh: Lingay  and numerous others but none named by Ordnance Survey
Grimsay (North): Eilean à Ghobha, Eilean Mòr
Grimsay (South): Caraigh Mhòr, Eilean na Cille, Eilean nan Gamhna, Eileanan Stafa, Oitir Bheag, Siusaigh, Steiseigh
Ronay:  Eilean an Fheidh, Eilean na Clioche, Eilean nan h-Iolaire, Eilean nan  Gamhna, Eilean nan Gearr, Garbh Eilean Mòr, Huanariagh
Wiay: An Dubh-sgeir à Deas, Cleit Mhòr, Lingeigh, Reagam, Scaracleit

North Uist

North west coast: Eilean Mhorain, Haskeir, Hesgeir Eagach, Lingeigh
Traigh Bhalaigh: Eilean Dubh Mòr, Stangram, Torogaigh
Sound of Harris, East:
 Loch Mhic Phail: Cafuam, Croabhagun, Eilean Fhionnlaidh, Frobost Island, Hestum, Mealla Bru, Rangas, Teilum
West Coast: Causamul, Eilean Trostain
East coast:
Loch Euphort: Eilean an Stiobuill, Eilean Mhic Shealtair, Eilean nam Mult, Orasaigh, Riobhaig Mhòr, Steisaigh, Treanaigh
Loch nam Madadh:  Cnap Ruigh Dubh, Eilean Bhalaig, Eilean Phail,  Fathoire, Fearamas, Flodaigh, Glas Eilean Mòr, Hamarsaigh, Madadh Beag, Madadh Gruamach, Madadh Mòr, Oronsay
Ceallasaigh Mòr: Orasay
Ceallasaigh Beag: Callum More, Cliasagh Beag, Cliasagh Mor, Corr Eilean Keallasay, Eileanan Dhomhnuill, Eilean Bridich, Eilean Gheoidh, Eilean Mhidhinis, Eilean nan Lion, Fearamas, Lonachan,  Rhiobhagan Mhidhinis
South Coast: Craigionn, Eilean an Teampaill, Eilean Iochdrach, Eilean Mòr
 Causeway: Eileanan Glasa, Eilean Ghiorr, Eilean Leathann, Eilean na h-Airigh, Gairbh-eilean
Baleshare: Bhorogaigh, Eilean Mòr, Eilean nan Carnan, Glas-eilean Beag, Horaigh
Flodaigh Mòr: Duibh-eilean, Flodaigh Beag
Kirkibost: Bior Eilean, Eilean Mòr, Sromaigh
Oronsay: Fuskafaol, Greanam, Lingay
Vallay: Dun Tomaidh, Sgeir Dubh Mòr

Monach Isles

Ceann Ear: Heilleam, Stocaigh
Ceann Iar: Deasgair, Raisgeir, Stromay
Shillay: Eilean Siorruidh, Thusigeirean
Sibhinis: None

Sound of Harris
Harris – Rubha Reinis to Gob an Tobha:  Bumersam Beag, Copaigh, Crago, Dun Arn,  Eilean Reinis, Eire, Gilsaigh, Gousman, Gumersam Mhòr, Langaigh, Liungaigh, Saghaigh Beag, Saghaigh Mòr, Sgarabhaigh, Sgeir Sine, Sromaigh
Berneray: Bhaiteam, Greineam
Boreray: Bogha Mairi, Spuir
Ensay: Creag Ruadh, Dubh Sgeir, Sleicham, Sromaigh, Suam
Hermetray: Bhacasaigh, Dun Mhic Leathann, Eileana Dubha, Fuam, Greineam, Grodaigh, Hulmatraigh, Orasaigh, Righe nam Ban
Killegray: Caolaigh, Eilean Chodam, Eilean na Ceardaich, Langa Sgeir, Sgeir Dhubh, Sgeir Mhurain
Pabbay: Cuidhnis
Shillay: Siolaigh Beag
Stromay: Heastam Sròmaigh, Rusgaigh, Orasaigh
Tahay: Bhotarsaigh, Cleite nan Luch, Creag nan Sealladh, Fuam na h-Ola, Narstaigh, Opasaigh, Sarstaigh, Sgeir à Chuain, Trollaman

West Harris
Gob an Tobha to Rubha Huisinis: Gaisgeir, Glas-sgeir, Gloraig Huisinis, Gloraig Tharasaigh, Iosaigh
Rubha Huisinis to Ceann Loch Resort: Greine Sgeir,
Scarp: Cearstaigh, Duisgeir, Fladaigh
Soay Mòr: Soay Beag
Taransay: None

East Harris
Loch Seaforth: Eilean Mharaig,  Glas Sgeir
Àrd Caol to Rubha Crago: Eilean Reiningeadil 
Rubha Crago to Rubha Bocaig (including East Loch Tarbert): Cuidsgeir, Eilean à Gheoidh, Eileanan à Ghille-bheid, Eilean Aird Rainis, Eilean an Direcleit, Eilean Dubh, Eilean Mhic Fionnlaidh, Eilean na Gearrabreac, Eilean na Sgaite, Gloraig à Chaimbeulach, Gloraig Dubh, Gloraig Iosal, Sgeir an Leim Mhoir, Sgeir Glas, Sgeir Urgha
Rubha Bocaig to Rubha Reinis: (see also Stockinish Island): Bhalaigh, Caiream, Corr-eilean, Eilean Chuidhtinis, Eilean Dubh, Eilean Dubh Chollaim, Eilean Fhionnsbhaigh, Eilean Lingreabhaigh, Eilean Mhanais, Glas Sgeir (2)
Scalpay: Fuam an Tolla, Greineam, Raiream, Rosaigh, Stiolamair, Stiughaigh, Stiughaigh na Leum, Thamarasaigh
Sgeotasaigh: Eilean Dubh, Eilean Rainich, Sgeir Ghlas
Stockinish: Eilean Leasait, Eilean nan Eun

Shiant Islands
Eilean Mhuire: Seann Chaisteal
Garbh Eilean: Sgeir Mianais
The Galtachan: Bodach, Damhag, Galta Beag, Galta Mòr, Stacan Laidir, Sgeir Mhic a' Ghobha

Lewis

South west coast
Ceann Loch Resort to Aird Dhrolaige:  Liongam, Staca Liath
Aird Dhrolaige to Camas Uig: Eilean Molach, Greineam, Sgeir an Tamna, Sgeir Liath, Staca Leathann
Camas Uig: Fraoch Eilean, Leac Holm, Sarah's Island, Sgeir a' Chàis, Sgeir Liath,  Sgeir Sheilibhig, Tom, Tolm
Camas Uig to Gallan Head:  Gallan Beg,   Sgeir Fiabhaig Tarras, Sgeir Gallan
Eilean Mhealasta: Hairsgeir Beag, Hairsgeir Mòr

Loch Ròg
Loch Ròg:
Loch Ceann Hulabhig: Eilean Trosdam, Eilean Orasaigh, Eilean an Tighe, Eimisgeir
Loch Charlabhaigh: Eilean Bhinndealaim
Loch Ròg Beag: Eilean Dubh, Eileanan Glasa
Loch Shiadair: Crovag
Ceabhaigh: Greinam, Sgeir nan Cliabh
Eilean Chearstaidh: Bratanais Mòr, Eilean Sgarastaigh
Flodaigh: Gousam
Fuaigh Beag: Aird Orasaigh, Cliatasaigh, Eilean nam Feannag, Floday, Geile Sgeir, Garbh Eilean, Glas Eilean, Linngeam
Fuaigh Mòr: EileanTeinis, Eunaigh Beag, Eunaigh Mòr, Geile Sgeir, Sgeir Dubh Mhòr, Sgeir Liath
Great Bernera: Eilean Beag, Eilean Bhacasaigh, Eilean Mòr, Eilean Riosaigh, Eughlam, Greineam, Liongam Valasay
Little Bernera: Bearasaigh, Campaigh, Cealasaigh, Cruitear, Cul Campaigh, Eilean Fir Chrothair, Flodaigh, Hairsgeir, Mas Sgier, Seanna Chnoc, Sgeir à Mhurain, Sgeir Dhearg, Sgeir na h-Aon Chaorocah.
Pabaigh Mòr: Bogha Dubh, Mas Sgeir, Pabeigh Beag, Siaram Mòr
Vacsay: Sgeir Bocaig, Sgeir Fail, Sgeir na h-Aon Chaorach, Trathasam

North west coast
Aird Laimisiadair to Butt of Lewis: Buistean, Cleite Gile, Cul Chraigeam, Craigeam, Dubh Sgeir, Eilean Arnol, Lith Sgeir, Mas Sgeir, Sgeir Dhail, Sgeir Dhearg Cul Chraigeam, Sgeir Lainganish, Sgeir Mhòr, Stac à Phris

East Coast

Butt of Lewis to Tolsta Head: Am Braga, Braighe Mhòr, Dùn Èistean, Dun Eoradail, Eilean Glas, Mas Sgeir
Tolsta Head to Tiumpan Head: Heisgeir, Lada Sgeir, Langasgeir Mòr, Sgeir Leathann
Tiumpan Head to Rubha Raerinis: Beasts of Holm, Buaile Mhòr,  Eilean à Chaise, Eilean à Chrotaich, Eilean Beag Phabail, Eilean Mòr Phabail, Eilean na Greinne, Eilean Grioda, Eilean nan Uan, Eilean Thuilm, Mol Shildinis, Sgeir Mhòr Shildinis
Rubha Raerinis to Rubha na Creige Moire (including Loch Erisort and Loch Liurbost): Bhatarsaidh, Dun Bharclin, Eilean à Bhlair, Eilean Cheois, Eilean Glas, Eilean Miabhiag, Eilean Mòr Lacasaidh, Eilean Mhic Thormaid, Eilean Orasaigh (2), Eilean Rosaidh, Eilean Thoraidh,  Garbh Eilean, Glas Sgeir, Riosaigh, Seumas Cleite, Sgeiran Arbhair, Sgeir Tanais, Stac Tabhaidh, Tabhaigh Beah, Tabhaigh Mòr, Tannaraidh
Rubha na Creige Moire to Gob Rubha Uisnis (including Loch Sealg): Bogha Ruadh
Gob Rubha Uisnis to Rubha Brìodog: Eilean Beag à Bhaigh, Eilean Dubh à Bhaigh, Eilean Glas na h-Acarsaid Fhalaich, Eilean Mòr à Bhaigh, Eilean Thinngartsaigh, Sgeir Mhòr Bhalamuis
Eilean Chaluim Chille: Eilean Calabraigh, Crois Eilean, Duine, Eilean a Bhlair, Riasiagh, Sgeir nan Muirsgian, Sgeir nan Each
Eilean Liubhaird: Sgeir Fhraoich, Sgeir nan Caorach, Stac à Bhaigh
Seaforth Island: None

Small archipelagos

There are various small archipelagos within the Outer Hebrides. These include:

See also

 History of the Outer Hebrides
 Flora and fauna of the Outer Hebrides
 Religion in the Outer Hebrides
 List of places in the Western Isles
 Inner Hebrides
 List of Inner Hebrides
 List of Orkney islands
 Churchill Barriers
 List of Shetland islands
 Islands of the Clyde
 Islands of the Forth
 List of islands of Scotland
 List of islands of the British Isles
 North Sea islands
 Rockall

References and footnotes

General references
 Armit, Ian (1998) Scotland's Hidden History. Tempus (in association with Historic Scotland). 
 Haswell-Smith, Hamish. (2004) The Scottish Islands. Edinburgh. Canongate. 
 Hunter, James (2000) Last of the Free: A History of the Highlands and Islands of Scotland. Edinburgh. Mainstream. 
 
 Maclean, Charles (1977) Island on the Edge of the World: the Story of St. Kilda. Edinburgh. Canongate. 
 
 Murray, W.H. (1973) The Islands of Western Scotland. London. Eyre Methuen. 
 Thompson, Francis (1968) Harris and Lewis, Outer Hebrides. Newton Abbot. David & Charles. 

Notes

Citations

Outer Hebrides